Agesilaus may refer to:

Agesilaus I ( BC), Agiad king of Sparta
Agesilaus II ( BC), Eurypontid king of Sparta, brother of Agis II
Agesilaus (general), brother to Agis III, Eurypontid king of Sparta ( BC)
Agesilaus (statesman), ephor in 242 BC, also uncle of Agis IV, king of Sparta ( BC)
Agesilaus (historian), an ancient Greek historian
Agesander (Hades), an epithet of the Greek god Hades, sometimes rendered as "Agesilaus"
Agesilaus (Xenophon), biographical work about Agesilaus II written by Greek historian Xenophon

de:Agesilaos#Bekannte Namensträger